The BMW M44 is a DOHC four-cylinder petrol engine which replaced the BMW M42 and was produced from 1996 to 2000 at the Steyr factory. It was produced alongside the BMW M43 SOHC four-cylinder engine, with the M44 being the higher performance engine. In 2000, the M44 was replaced by the BMW N42 engine.

Design 
As per the final versions of the M42, the M44 has a dual length intake manifold ("DISA"). There was also a 70% reduction in valve train friction which contributed to the engine being more quiet and fuel efficient than its predecessor. 

The M44 has a cast iron block and aluminium cylinder head, as per its predecessor.

Versions

M44B19 

A compression ratio of 10.0:1 is used, along with the Bosch Motronic 5.2 engine management system.

The crankshaft has an increased stroke from the M42's  and is cast instead of forged. Also revised were the valve actuators which are of a roller pivoting arm type.

Applications:
 1996-2000 E36 318i (North America only), 318is and 318ti
 1996-1999 Z3 1.9

With time this engine was replaced by BMW N42 engine.

See also 
 BMW
 List of BMW engines

References 

M44
Straight-four engines
Gasoline engines by model